Kazi Zafar Ahmad (1 July 193927 August 2015) was a Bangladeshi politician of the Jatiya Party, who was the Prime Minister of Bangladesh from 1989 to 1990.

Early life
Ahmed was born in 1939, in village: Kazi Bari  Cheora Chauddagram Upazila, Comilla, British India (now Bangladesh), the son of Cheora Kazi Bari. He was a freedom fighter and a student leader at the University of Dhaka, where he obtained a M.A. degree in history.

Political career
Ahmed was a Maoist. From 1962 to 1963 he served as the General Secretary of the East Pakistan Chattra Union. In 1966 he joined the Maoist Communist Party and became a labour leader, mainly concentrating in organising the workers in the Tongi industrial area. During the Bangladesh Liberation war he worked for Mujibnagar government.

After independence, he joined the National Awami Party of Maulana Bhashani and became its Secretary General. He supported the ideology of Islamic socialism by Maulana Bhashani. He declared that he would form a responsible opposition party. Later he formed the United Peoples' Party  (UPP) in 1974 with Captain Abdul Halim Chowdhury. He worked with the People's Democratic Party under President Ziaur Rahman after he assumed the presidency through a referendum. Ahmed became Minister of Education.

Ahmed also played a leading role in the anti military role of President Hussain Muhammad Ershad. But the period since 1975 in Bangladesh witnessed realignment of politics and leaders leaving their old parties and joining new ones. Ahmed dissolved his UPP and joined President Ershad's Jatiya Party. On 3 July 1985 he was made a Minister in the cabinet of President Ershad. Ershad on the 3 March 1988 made Ahmed the deputy Prime Minister under Prime Minister Moudud Ahmed. He defended the decision of Ershad to make Islam the state religion of Bangladesh as move against fundamentalism on 6 June 1988. He served in the Ershad Government as Minister of Commerce from 1986 to 1989. In August 1989 he was appointed Prime Minister replacing Moudud Ahmed who was made vice-president. He served as the Prime Minister from August 1989 to 6 December 1990. He fled to India after Ershad resigned from power. He became known as Sugar Zafar for his role in the theft of a sugar shipment. Ahmed criticised Ershad for joining the Bangladesh Awami League government in 1997 and created his own party called Jatiya Dal, which joined the opposition Bangladesh Nationalist Party. Ershad was imprisoned since he lost power and was freed in 1996 after Bangladesh Awami League came to power.

Ahmed was sentenced to 15 years imprisonment by a Dhaka court in November 1999 on corruption charges related to the misappropriation of funds meant for an orphanage. He moved to Australia and successfully applied for asylum. In Australia he was able to access government disability pension for the treatment of his kidney. John Howard, Prime Minister of Australia, called an inquiry into how Ahmed was able to secure asylum.

Ahmed competed in the 2008 Bangladesh General Election from the Comilla-11. Ahmed, the presidium member of Jatiya Party, criticised Ershad for agreeing to join the 2014 Bangladesh election organised by Bangladesh Awami League led coalition government.  On 5 May 2013 he went on the stage at a Hefajat-e Islam rally in Motijheel. In 2013 he was suspended from Jatiya Party by Ershad and a few hours later Ahmed tried to expel Ershad from the Jatiya Party, after which he formed his own faction of Jatiya Party. Golam Moshi joined the Ahmed faction of Jatiya Party. In January 2014 he joined the Bangladesh Nationalist Party led 20-party alliance with his faction of Jatiya Party.

Personal life 
Ahmed was married to Momtaz Begum. They had three daughters, Kazi Joya Ahmed, Kazi Sonia Ahmed, and Kazi Rona Ahmed.

Death 
Ahmed died on 27 August 2015 in United Hospital, Dhaka, Bangladesh.

References

1939 births
2015 deaths
Bangladeshi Muslims
Jatiya Party politicians
People from Comilla District
University of Dhaka alumni
Prime Ministers of Bangladesh
People from Comilla
Deputy Prime Ministers of Bangladesh